Todd Wilbur is an American author of the Top Secret Recipes series of cook books. The books contain clone recipes for famous named restaurant or pre-processed foods, like McDonald's Big Mac, or Nabisco's Oreo cookies. Wilbur has sold over 5 million books. Wilbur has appeared on Dr. Oz, Good Morning America, Fox & Friends, Today Show , The Oprah Winfrey Show and Steve Harvey.

On October 7, 2011, CMT premiered the new series Top Secret Recipe, where Wilbur set out to recreate an iconic American brand name food in three days.  

Todd Wilbur is the creator of Hell Flakes, and a line of Top Secret Rubs that duplicate the taste of famous foods - "Just like the Pro Chefs Use".

Books 
Top Secret Recipes
More Top Secret Recipes
Top Secret Restaurant Recipes
Top Secret Recipes Lite!
Low-Fat Top Secret Recipes
Top Secret Recipes – Sodas, Smoothies, Spirits, & Shakes
Even More Top Secret Recipes
The Best Of Top Secret Recipes (created exclusively for QVC)
Top Secret Recipes Unlocked
Top Secret Restaurant Recipes 2
''Top Secret Restaurant Recipes 3
Top Secret Recipe STEP-BY-STEP

References

External links
Top Secret Recipes web site
Top Secret Recipe/CMT Press web site
Top Secret Recipe/New York Times review

Year of birth missing (living people)
Living people
American food writers